HMS Sterlet was a second-batch S-class submarine built during the 1930s for the Royal Navy. Completed in 1938, the boat fought in the Second World War. The submarine is one of the 12 boats named in the song Twelve Little S-Boats. Thus far she has been the only ship of the Royal Navy to be named Sterlet.

Design and description
The second batch of S-class submarines were designed as slightly improved and enlarged versions of the earlier boats of the class and were intended to operate in the North and Baltic Seas. They displaced  on the surface and  submerged. The S-class submarines had a crew of 40 officers and ratings.

For surface running, the boats were powered by two  diesel engines, each driving one propeller shaft. When submerged each propeller was driven by a  electric motor. They could reach  on the surface and  underwater.

The S-class boats were armed with six 21-inch (533 mm) torpedo tubes in the bow. They carried six reload torpedoes for a total of a dozen torpedoes. They were also armed with a 3-inch (76 mm) deck gun.

Construction and career
Ordered on 2 March 1936, Sterlet was laid down on 14 July 1936 in HM Dockyard, Chatham and was launched on 22 September 1936. The boat was completed on 6 April 1938.

At the onset of the Second World War, Sterlet was a member of the 2nd Submarine Flotilla. From 23–26 August 1939 the 2nd Submarine Flotilla transferred to its war bases at Dundee and Blyth.

On 8 April 1940 Sterlet left for a patrol in the Skagerrak, off Norway under the command of Lt. Gerard Henry Stacpoole Haward. Four days later she unsuccessfully attacked a convoy of three merchant ships and a destroyer. The following day she was assigned a new patrol area and on 14 April torpedoed the German gunnery training ship , leading to her sinking the following day.

She was possibly sunk by the German anti-submarine trawlers UJ-125, UJ-126 and UJ-128 on 18 April. Alternatively, she may have struck a mine whilst returning to port.

Citations

References
 
  
 
 
 
 
 

 

British S-class submarines (1931)
World War II shipwrecks in the Atlantic Ocean
1937 ships
World War II submarines of the United Kingdom
Lost submarines of the United Kingdom
Maritime incidents in 1939
Maritime incidents in April 1940
Ships lost with all hands
Submarines sunk by German warships